Doubtful Sounds is a community choir based in Wellington, New Zealand. The choir mainly sings a capella arrangements of popular songs. The director is Bryan Crump, who formed the choir in 2009. Crump arranges much of the music for the choir.

Crump was also for 17 years the host of a long-running radio programme on Radio New Zealand - Nights.

The choir has performed in various venues around Wellington, including St. Peter's Anglican Church, and community halls at Breaker Bay and Paekākāriki. Some notable performances have been given in unusual venues such as the stone circle at Stonehenge Aotearoa, and underground in the Wrights Hill Fortress.

References

New Zealand choirs
Musical groups from Wellington